Jonathan Quinn Brookins (born August 13, 1985) is an American mixed martial artist who competed as a featherweight for the Ultimate Fighting Championship. A professional MMA competitor since 2006, Brookins has mostly fought in Florida, as well as competing in The Ultimate Fighter: Team GSP vs. Team Koscheck. On December 4, 2010, Brookins defeated Michael Johnson to become the Ultimate Fighter and earn a contract with the UFC. During his time at Lindenwood University he was also the college roommate of former fellow UFC fighter Mike Rio.

Early life
Brookins was born on August 13, 1985, in Portland, Oregon. He attended high school at Century High School in Hillsboro, Oregon, a suburb of Portland. There he started wrestling, winning a state title his senior year and earning a scholarship to Lindenwood University.

Mixed martial arts career

Background
Brookins was introduced to mixed martial arts by Charles Bennett. After meeting him and training with him, Brookins made his professional MMA debut against Allen Berube, a TUF 5 veteran. Having only trained in wrestling, Brookins surprised himself by winning via KO in under twenty seconds.

Brookins has mostly fought at featherweight, most notably in World Extreme Cagefighting where he lost to José Aldo via TKO in the third round. Brookins would later rebound at Bellator 1 where he defeated Stephen Ledbetter via submission (rear naked choke).

Brookins then won two fights in G-Force fights, the most notable being a submission victory over Luis Palomino.

The Ultimate Fighter
Brookins then signed with the Ultimate Fighting Championship to compete in The Ultimate Fighter: Team GSP vs. Team Koscheck.

In the debut episode, Brookins faced fellow wrestler Ran Weathers. Brookins would go on to take a unanimous decision victory in two rounds. Following this, Brookins was selected by Team GSP. Brookins was GSPs second pick and the fourth overall.

Brookins was picked by GSP to face Sevak Magakian in the preliminary house fights. Brookins faked a takedown, which fooled Magakian. Brookins was then able to take down Magakian before attempting a standing rear naked choke. Brookins eventually secured the submission at 2:04 of the opening round.

In the quarter-finals, Brookins faced Judo specialist Sako Chivitchian. Brookins was able to throw Chivitchian to the mat, which forced Chivitchian to try to stand up. Brookins then got hooks in and worked for a rear naked choke, eventually sealing it soon after, to advance to the semi-finals.

In the semi-final round, Brookins faced teammate Kyle Watson. In a somewhat lopsided bout, Brookins controlled Watson on the ground to take a 30–27 judges decision. The win moved Brookins into the finals against Michael Johnson.

Ultimate Fighting Championship
Brookins defeated Michael Johnson at The Ultimate Fighter: Team GSP vs. Team Koscheck Finale. In the first round, Brookins was dominated on the feet by Johnson. However, he pulled through and used his wrestling to edge rounds 2 and 3, taking the unanimous decision to become The Ultimate Fighter.

Brookins was expected to face John Makdessi on April 30, 2011 at UFC 129. However, Brookins was pulled from the bout and replaced by Kyle Watson.

Brookins was expected to face Jeremy Stephens on June 4, 2011 at The Ultimate Fighter 13 Finale. However, Brookins was forced from the bout with an injury and replaced by Danny Downes.

Brookins returned to featherweight for his next fight and faced Erik Koch on September 17, 2011 at UFC Fight Night 25. He lost the fight via unanimous decision.

Brookins was expected to face Rani Yahya on February 15, 2012 at UFC on Fuel TV 1. However, Yahya was forced out of the bout with an injury and replaced by Vagner Rocha. Brookins won via KO in the first round.

Brookins faced Charles Oliveira on June 1, 2012 at The Ultimate Fighter 15 Finale. He lost the fight via submission due to a guillotine choke in the second round.

Brookins next faced Dustin Poirier on December 15, 2012 at The Ultimate Fighter: Team Carwin vs. Team Nelson Finale. He lost the back-and-forth fight via submission in the first round.

On December 21, 2012, Brookins decided to retire from MMA in order to move to India and devote his time to practicing Yoga full-time.

Legacy Fighting Championship
On January 24, 2014 it was announced that Brookins would return from his retirement to fight for Legacy Fighting Championship. He dropped down to the Flyweight division to make his debut on March 21 at Legacy FC 29 against Cody Fuller. Brookins was victorious in his flyweight debut with a second round submission finish. He then faced Austin Lyons in a bantamweight bout at Legacy FC 34 on August 29, 2014. Brookins lost the fight via unanimous decision.

Pancrase
Brookins made his Pancrase debut at Pancrase 262 in a non-title fight taking on the Pancrase Bantamweight Champion Shintaro Ishiwatari  . He won the fight by unanimous decision.

Mixed martial arts record

|-
| Win
| align=center| 16–10
| Decky Dalton 
| Decision (unanimous)
| BAMMA 28
| 
| align=center| 3
| align=center| 5:00
| Belfast, Northern Ireland
| 
|-
|Loss
|align=center|15–10
|Kyle Nelson
|Decision (split) 
|Z Promotions: Fight Night Medicine Hat 2
|
|align=center|3
|align=center|5:00
|Medicine Hat, Alberta, Canada
|
|-
|Loss
|align=center|15–9
|Tom Niinimäki
|Decision (unanimous)
|Euro FC 1
|
|align=center|3
|align=center|5:00
|Espoo, Finland
|
|-
| Loss
| align=center|15–8
| Shintaro Ishiwatari
| Decision (unanimous)
| Pancrase 279
| 
| align=center| 3
| align=center| 5:00
| Tokyo, Japan
|
|-
| Win
| align=center| 15–7
| Shintaro Ishiwatari
| Decision (unanimous)
| Pancrase 262
| 
| align=center| 3
| align=center| 5:00
| Tokyo, Japan
|  Non Title Fight
|-
| Loss
| align=center| 14–7
| Austin Lyons
| Decision (unanimous)
| Legacy FC 34
| 
| align=center| 3
| align=center| 5:00
| Tunica, Mississippi, United States
| 
|-
| Win
| align=center| 14–6
| Cody Fuller
| Submission (rear-naked choke)
| Legacy FC 29
| 
| align=center| 2
| align=center| 3:02
| Tulsa, Oklahoma, United States   
| 
|-
| Loss
| align=center| 13–6
| Dustin Poirier
| |Submission (D'arce choke)
| The Ultimate Fighter 16 Finale
| 
| align=center| 1
| align=center| 4:15
| Las Vegas, Nevada, United States   
| 
|-
| Loss
| align=center| 13–5
| Charles Oliveira
| Submission (guillotine choke)
| The Ultimate Fighter 15 Finale
| 
| align=center| 2
| align=center| 2:42
| Las Vegas, Nevada, United States   
| 
|-
| Win
| align=center| 13–4
| Vagner Rocha
| KO (punches)
| UFC on Fuel TV: Sanchez vs. Ellenberger
| 
| align=center| 1
| align=center| 1:32
| Omaha, Nebraska, United States
| 
|-
| Loss
| align=center| 12–4
| Erik Koch
| Decision (unanimous)
| UFC Fight Night: Shields vs. Ellenberger
| 
| align=center| 3
| align=center| 5:00
| New Orleans, Louisiana, United States
| 
|-
| Win
| align=center| 12–3
| Michael Johnson
| Decision (unanimous)
| The Ultimate Fighter 12 Finale
| 
| align=center| 3
| align=center| 5:00
| Las Vegas, Nevada, United States
| 
|-
| Win
| align=center| 11–3
| Yosdenis Cedeno
| Decision (unanimous)
| G-Force Fights: Bad Blood 3
| 
| align=center| 3
| align=center| 5:00
| Miami, Florida, United States
| 
|-
| Win
| align=center| 10–3
| Luis Palomino
| Submission (rear-naked choke)
| G-Force Fights: Bad Blood 2
| 
| align=center| 2
| align=center| 1:44
| Coral Gables, Florida, United States
| 
|-
| Win
| align=center| 9–3
| Stephen Ledbetter
| Submission (rear-naked choke)
| Bellator 1
| 
| align=center| 1
| align=center| 3:32
| Hollywood, Florida, United States
| 
|-
| Loss
| align=center| 8–3
| José Aldo
| TKO (punches)
| WEC 36: Faber vs. Brown
| 
| align=center| 3
| align=center| 0:45
| Hollywood, Florida, United States
| 
|-
| Win
| align=center| 8–2
| Jose Santibanez
| Submission (rear-naked choke)
| South Coast Promotions
| 
| align=center| 1
| align=center| 2:07
| Houston, Texas, United States
| 
|-
| Loss
| align=center| 7–2
| Greg Loughran
| Decision (split)
| Cage Warriors: USA Battle Royale
| 
| align=center| 3
| align=center| 5:00
| Kissimmee, Florida, United States
| 
|-
| Win
| align=center| 7–1
| Jose Figueroa
| Submission (guillotine choke)
| WEF: King of the Streets
| 
| align=center| 1
| align=center| 2:47
| Kissimmee, Florida, United States
| 
|-
| Win
| align=center| 6–1
| Donald Brook
| Submission (punches)
| Harmful Intent Promotions 2
| 
| align=center| 1
| align=center| 0:35
| Estero, Florida, United States
| 
|-
| Win
| align=center| 5–1
| Yves Jabouin
| Submission (elbows)
| Ultimate Warrior Challenge 2
| 
| align=center| 2
| align=center| 3:35
| Jacksonville, Florida, United States
| 
|-
| Loss
| align=center| 4–1
| Harris Sarmiento
| Decision (unanimous)
| Shakedown: Maui vs. Oahu
| 
| align=center| 3
| align=center| 5:00
| Hawaii, United States
| 
|-
| Win
| align=center| 4–0
| Sean Bartlett
| TKO (punches)
| Combat Fighting Championships 3
| 
| align=center| 1
| align=center| 4:05
| Orlando, Florida, United States
| 
|-
| Win
| align=center| 3–0
| Ryan Nakamura
| Submission (rear-naked choke)
| Combat Fighting Championship 2
| 
| align=center| 1
| align=center| 1:09
| Orlando, Florida, United States
| 
|-
| Win
| align=center| 2–0
| York Ash
| Submission (guillotine choke)
| Full Throttle 8
| 
| align=center| 1
| align=center| 3:58
| Atlanta, Georgia, United States
| 
|-
| Win
| align=center| 1–0
| Allen Berube
| KO (punch)
| Combat Fighting Championship
| 
| align=center| 1
| align=center| 0:19
| Orlando, Florida, United States
|

References

External links
Official Legacy Profile
Official UFC Profile
 

The Ultimate Fighter winners
American male mixed martial artists
Mixed martial artists from Florida
Featherweight mixed martial artists
Lightweight mixed martial artists
Mixed martial artists utilizing wrestling
Mixed martial artists utilizing Brazilian jiu-jitsu
American practitioners of Brazilian jiu-jitsu
Living people
Sportspeople from Portland, Oregon
1985 births
Mixed martial artists from Oregon
Sportspeople from Hillsboro, Oregon
Ultimate Fighting Championship male fighters